Dwayne Gylywoychuk (born June 27, 1973) is a Canadian former professional ice hockey defenceman.

Junior career
Gylywoychuk played five seasons (1989 – 1994) of major junior hockey with the Brandon Wheat Kings of the Western Hockey League. He holds the franchise record for games played for the Wheat Kings, scoring 9 goals and 40 assists for 49 points, while earning 614 penalty minutes, in 323 games played.

Professional career
Gylywoychuk went on to play with eight different teams in four different professional leagues over the course of his seven-year playing career. He retired as a player following the 2000-01 season, after winning the English Premier Ice Hockey League Playoff Championship as a member of the Romford Raiders.

Coaching career
Gylywoychuk joined the Brandon Weat Kings as an assistant coach commencing with the 2003–04 WHL season, and was named the team's head coach for the 2012–13 WHL season. The Wheat King finished the 2012–13 season as the Eastern Conference's last place team, and Gylywoychuk was replaced as head coach by General Manager Kelly McCrimmon prior to the start of the 2013–14 season.

Career statistics

References

External links

1973 births
Living people
Brandon Wheat Kings coaches
Brandon Wheat Kings players
Canadian ice hockey defencemen
Central Texas Stampede players
Dayton Bombers players
Greensboro Monarchs players
Ice hockey people from Manitoba
Jacksonville Lizard Kings players
Romford Raiders players
Shreveport Mudbugs players
Sportspeople from Brandon, Manitoba
Waco Wizards players
Wichita Thunder players
Canadian expatriate ice hockey players in England
Canadian ice hockey coaches